The 1936–37 Campionat de Catalunya season was the 38th since its establishment and was played between 4 October and 20 December 1936.

Division One

League table

Results

Top goalscorers

Division Two

League table

Copa Catalunya seasons
1936–37 in Spanish football